Toller is a ward within the City of Bradford Metropolitan District Council of West Yorkshire, England. The population of the ward as of the 2011 Census was 19,914.

Demographics

The area is ethnically diverse, with a significant Pakistani population.

Councillors 
Toller ward is represented on Bradford Council by three Labour Party councillors, Imran Hussain, Fozia Shaheen and Arshad Hussain. Councillor Imran Hussain is also Deputy Leader of Bradford Council's Labour Group.

 indicates seat up for re-election.

See also
Listed buildings in Bradford (Toller Ward)

References

External links 
 BCSP (Internet Explorer only)
 BBC election results, 2004
 Council ward profile (pdf)

Wards of Bradford